Jontavius Morris (born December 16, 1993) is an American football coach and former defensive tackle. He is a graduate assistant at Purdue University. Morris played college football at the University of Alabama at Birmingham for coaches Garrick McGee and Bill Clark from 2012 to 2014 and at Western Kentucky University for coach Jeff Brohm and played in the National Football League (NFL) in 2012.

College career
Morris played college football for three years at the University of Alabama in Birmingham until the school suspended its football program in 2014. He transferred to Western Kentucky in 2015.

Professional career

Pre-draft

Tampa Bay Buccaneers
On May 1, 2016, Morris was signed by the Tampa Bay Buccaneers as an undrafted free agent.

Coaching career
In 2018, Morris became a graduate assistant at Purdue University.

References

External links
UAB Blazers bio
Western Kentucky Hilltoppers bio
Tampa Bay Buccaneers bio

1993 births
Living people
American football defensive linemen
Sportspeople from Albany, Georgia
Players of American football from Georgia (U.S. state)
UAB Blazers football players
Western Kentucky Hilltoppers football players
Tampa Bay Buccaneers players
Purdue Boilermakers football coaches
African-American sportsmen
21st-century African-American sportspeople